Sarah Sharp Hamer was a 19th-century novelist from Yorkshire, England who wrote in several different genres, including home-economics, history, and children's literature. Hamer wrote more than a dozen books under three different pen names including What Girls Can Do (Phillis Browne), Mrs. Somerville and Mary Carpenter (Phyllis Browne), and Happy Little People (Olive Patch).  Her son, Sam Hield Hamer, was also a notable children's author.

See below section "List of Books" for the full list of her works written under all her pseudonyms.

Early childhood 
Sarah Sharp (Heaton) Hamer was born on August 25, 1839, in Yorkshire, Leeds, England.  According to a census in 1851 and other records, Sarah was born to parents John Heaton (1802-1866) and Rachel Aspin (1806-1868) and was one of five children in the family.  However, baptismal records show that Sarah's mother is a woman named Elizabeth Heaton.  Sarah Sharp Heaton was baptized at St. Peter's in Leeds, England on September 15, 1839.  Not much is known about Sarah Heaton as a child, her siblings, or her parents.  Legal documentation states that that John Heaton, Sarah's father was a bookseller, which may have had an impact on Sarah's career choice

Marriage and adult life 
Sarah Sharp Hamer was married at the Camden Road Baptist Chapel in London on July 25, 1861, to John Hamer, who was an Englishman born in 1837.  The couple had six children and lived in District 9 of St. Pancras, London, England in 1881.  Two of their children followed in their parents’ footsteps and were also authors, editors, and publishers. As a writer, Hamer published most if not all of her works through Cassell and Company, a publishing firm that has since been bought by Orion Publishing. She died on 1 February 1927 at 69 Dartmouth Patk Hill, Kentish Town.

Publications and legacy 
Sarah Hamer continued to write and publish novels throughout her lifetime. Hamer wrote largely for young girls, specifically in the areas of home economics and natural history. Her book The Dictionary of Dainty Breakfasts (under the pseudonym Phillis Browne) was notable for helping set the trend of establishing breakfast as a necessary third meal of the day, as well as popularizing many common English breakfast foods. According to Kaori O'Connor "Early English cookbooks have recipes for lunch and for dinner, but no recipes at all for breakfast. Large breakfasts do not figure in English life or cookbooks until the nineteenth century, when they appear with dramatic suddenness." Food culture and "national" cuisines are often considered major elements of national identity and considered "sensitive barometers of both change and fundamental values" for a society. Hamer, along with other women writing instructional and scientific books for children, "were excluded from practicing as scientists, and thus from demonstrably adding new knowledge to the world; still, they were deeply invested in making science comprehensible and available to readers"

Notable children 
Sam H. Hamer began his career by editing the Little Folks Magazine, for Cassell and Company.  After he worked as an editor, Sam Hamer wrote numerous books including The Dolomites, Sunlight and Shade, and Stories and Pictures for Sundays.  For his writing, Sam Hamer even used a pen name for some of his works, just like his mother---Sam Browne.  

The other writer in the family was Margaret Hamer, who wrote under the pen name Maggie Browne and published Two Old Ladies, Two Foolish Fairies, and a Tom Cat  which was illustrated by Arthur Rackham, Chats about Germany, Little Mothers and their Children, and Wandering Ways.

Books

As Phyllis Browne 
 Mrs. Somerville and Mary Carpenter
 Diet and Cookery for Common Ailments
 The Girl's Own Cooking Book
 Myself and My Friends
 The Dictionary of Dainty Breakfasts
 Common-Sense Housekeeping
 A Year's Cookery. Giving Dishes for Breakfast, Lunch, and Dinner, for Every Day in the Year, Practical Instructions for Their Preparation; And A Special Section On Food For Invalids
 What Girls can Do: A Book for Mothers and Daughters
 Field Friends and Forest Foes
 Talks with Mothers: On the Home Training of Children

As Olive Patch 
 Sunny Spain: Its People and Places, With Glimpses of Its History 
 Happy Little People
 Christmas Frolic and Fun
 A Parcel of Children With Some Account of their Doings
 Our Darlings and their Pets
 Familiar Friends

References

1839 births
1927 deaths
19th-century English novelists